Košarkaški klub Napredak, commonly referred to as Napredak Aleksinac, is a men's professional basketball club based in Aleksinac, Serbia. They are currently competing in the Second League of Serbia. 

The club has been competing in the Second Basketball League of Serbia since the 2011–12 season.

Sponsorship naming
The club has had several denominations through the years due to its sponsorship:
 Napredak Maxi CO (2012–2016)
 Napredak Bosphorus (2016–2018)
 Napredak JKP (2018–2021)
 Napredak Metalka Majur (2021–2022)

Players

Coaches 

  Predrag Jaćimović (2014–2015)
  Boško Đokić (2015–2016)
  Slobodan Nikolić (2016–2017)
  Nebojša Raičević (2017–2021)
  Dušan Jelić (2021)
  Slaviša Bogavac (2021–2022)
  Nenad Stojković (2022–present)

Trophies and awards

Trophies
 Second League of Serbia (2nd-tier)
 Runners-up (1): 2018–19
 First Regional League (East Division) (3rd-tier)
 Winners (1): 2010–11

Notable players
  Miloš Trailović 
  Andreja Stevanović

References

External links
  
 Profile at eurobasket.com

Napredak Aleksinac
Napredak Aleksinac
Basketball teams established in 1957